Kazuya Fujita (藤田 一也, born July 8, 1983) is a Japanese professional baseball infielder for the Tohoku Rakuten Golden Eagles in Japan's Nippon Professional Baseball. He previously played with the Yokohama DeNA BayStars.

External links

NPB.com

1982 births
Baseball people from Tokushima Prefecture
Japanese baseball players
Kindai University alumni
Living people
Nippon Professional Baseball second basemen
Nippon Professional Baseball shortstops
Nippon Professional Baseball third basemen
Tohoku Rakuten Golden Eagles players
Yokohama BayStars players
Yokohama DeNA BayStars players